The Chief Minister of Balochistan is the head of Government of Balochistan and is elected by the Provincial Assembly of the Balochistan. The Chief Minister is elected by Balochistan Assembly for maximum of 5 years.

List of chief ministers of Balochistan

See also
 List of Chief Ministers of Khyber Pakhtunkhwa
 List of Chief Ministers of Punjab (Pakistan)
 List of Chief Ministers of Sindh

References 

Balochistan
 
Government of Balochistan, Pakistan